Progress Wrestling (stylized as PROGRESS) is a British professional wrestling promotion that was established in 2011 by comedian Jim Smallman, events and comedy promoter Jon Briley, and later, actor Glen Robinson (professionally known as Glen Joseph).

History
Progress was conceived by Jim Smallman and Jon Briley in 2011, who were both massive wrestling fans. Smallman is a big fan of "strong style" wrestling, Japanese in particular, and Briley was Smallman's agent.

In 2015, Progress appeared for five nights at Download Festival. In December of that year, they began running regular shows at The Ritz in Manchester. On 30 September 2018, Progress Wrestling held "Hello Wembley" at the SSE Arena. Billed by the promotion as the largest independent wrestling show in England for 30 years, the event drew 4,750 people; making it the most attended event in Progress Wrestling history. 

In 2016, the company began working relationships with other promotions. At Chapter 29 on 24 April in London, Progress hosted two qualifying matches for the WWE Cruiserweight Classic. In 2017, Progress wrestlers such as Pete Dunne, Tyler Bate, Trent Seven, and Mark Andrews participated in the WWE United Kingdom Championship Tournament, culminating in Bate being crowned the first ever WWE UK Champion.

Smallman left Progress at the end of 2019 after Chapter 100. In June 2020, Progress would be affected by reports of sexual harassment in the British independent circuit. After several accusations, Progress decided to no longer work with David Starr, Travis Banks, and El Ligero, as well as suspending indefinitely then- Tag team Champions Jordan Devlin and Scotty Davis, who vacated the titles. Ring announcer and creative team member Matt Richards also left the promotion. On 21 June 2020, it was announced that Glen Joseph was stepping down with Michael Oku, Vicky Haskins and James Amner all taking prominent roles in the company.

In 2021, Progress announced its return amidst the COVID-19 pandemic, travelling to South London to set up a temporary home at Theatre Peckham for Chapter 104: Natural Progression on 20 February, eventually producing 23 shows behind closed doors which featured on the WWE Network. On 31 December that year, ahead of their return to live shows in January 2022, it was announced that Progress had been acquired by Lee McAteer and Martyn Best - taking over ownership from Briley.

Demand Progress
Demand Progress is Progress' Pivotshare-based video-on-demand service that launced in March 2015. January 2017 saw the first episode of Freedom's Road, a new series from Progress which would feature matches taped specifically for the show and have a heavy focus on characters and plots.

Championships

Current champions

Inactive championships

Progress Proteus Championship
 
It was announced on 21 July 2019 that the old Progress Atlas Championship which was unified with the Progress World Championship will be replaced. The title was named after the shapechanging Greek god, Proteus. Progress co-founder Jim Smallman said in the announcement that the champion will be able to pick the stipulation for the championship matches, subject to approval by the promotion.

Reigns

Reception 

Patrick Lennon, wrestling journalist for the Daily Star, has attended and reviewed Progress shows.

Carrie Dunn, founder and main contributor of wrestling blog "The Only Way is Suplex", published the book Spandex, Screw Jobs & Cheap Pops: Inside the Business of British Pro Wrestling. Progress Wrestling features frequently in the book including opening a chapter regarding London based wrestling promotions.

See also
 List of Progress Wrestling tournaments
 NXT UK - Brand of the U.S-based WWE from which several Progress talent have competed for.

References

External links 

 Progress Wrestling (Progress) at Cagematch.net

Progress Wrestling
2011 establishments in the United Kingdom
Entertainment companies established in 2011